Manantico Creek, spelled Menantico on federal maps, is an  tributary of the Maurice River in Cumberland County, New Jersey in the United States.

It flows south/southwest down the eastern forested side of Vineland, through Menantico Lake, then, several miles downstream, meanders through Menantico Ponds.

See also
List of rivers of New Jersey

References

Rivers of Cumberland County, New Jersey
Rivers of New Jersey
Tributaries of the Maurice River
Wild and Scenic Rivers of the United States